The election to choose all elected positions in the counties of Maryland occurred on Tuesday, November 7, 2006. The Maryland County Executive Election, 2006, U.S. House election, 2006, U.S. Senate election, 2006, 2006 Maryland gubernatorial election, 2006 Maryland Senate election and 2006 Maryland House of Delegates election were scheduled for the same day. Seven charter counties chose elected officeholders in their county: Anne Arundel County, Baltimore County, Harford County, Howard County, Montgomery County, Prince George's County, and Wicomico County.

The County elected offices include: County Council, State's Attorney, Sheriff, Clerk of the Circuit Court, Probate Judge, and Register of Wills.  Please also see Maryland County Executive Election, 2006.

This page will describe notable races and candidates.

Anne Arundel County

Declared Candidates

District 1

Republican
John Edward Lindner

District 2

District 3

District 4

Democrat
G. James ("Jamie") Benoit, Jr.

Andrew Pruski

Walter Kenneth Moody

Devin F. Tucker

Republican
Sid Saab

District 5

Democrat
A. J. ("Tito") Baca

Republican
Cathleen Vitale

District 6

Democrat
Josh Cohen, Annapolis city Alderman; State Parole and Probation Agent; from Annapolis

Classy Hoyel, Annapolis city Alderwoman from Annapolis

Republican
Rene C. Swafford, Attorney-At-Law from Annapolis

District 7

Green Party
Robert L. Tufts - Green Party and environmental activist from Churchton

Republicans
Ed Reilly - Incumbent District 7

Potential Candidates

Republicans
Ron Dillon, Jr. - Incumbent District 3

C. Edward Middlebrooks - Incumbent District 2

Democrats

Greens

Candidate links

Republicans

Campaign Websites
Cathleen Vitale

Other Websites
Attorney Rene C. Swafford

Democrats

Campaign Websites
DevinTucker.com
joshcohen.org
jamiebenoit.com
votepruski.com
AJ Baca

Other Websites
Alderman Joshua J. Cohen

Greens

Campaign Websites
Vote Tufts 2006

Other Websites
Anne Arundel Green Party

Other links

Government Links
Maryland Campaign Finance Report Database
Anne Arundel County Board of Elections

News Articles

Baltimore County

Declared Candidates

Democrats

Republicans

Potential Candidates

Democrats

Republicans

Greens
Jeff Lambert

Harford County

Declared Candidates

Republicans

Democrats

Greens

Potential Candidates

Republicans

Democrats

Greens
Brian Bittner

Howard County

Declared Candidates

Democrats

Republicans

Greens

Potential Candidates

Democrats

Republicans

Greens

Montgomery County

At-Large

Democrats
 Tufail Ahmad
 Ashley "Hugh" Bailey
 Marc Elrich (winner)
 Reginald "Reggie" Felton
 Nancy Floreen, incumbent (winner)
 William "Bill" Jacobs
 Cary Lamari
 George Leventhal, incumbent (winner)
 Robert "Bo" Newsome
 Donell Peterman
 Bette Dale Petrides 
 Michael Subin, incumbent
 Duchy Trachtenberg (winner)

Republicans
 Tom Reinheimer
 Shelly Skolnick
 Amber Gnemi
 Adol Owens-Williams
 Stephen Abrams, school board member
(note: Adol Owens-Williams resigned from the race so Stephen Abrams could run as a Republican nominee)

District 1

Democrats
 Roger Berliner (winner)

Republicans
 Howard Denis, incumbent

District 2

Democrats
 Sharon Dooley
 Mike Knapp, incumbent (winner)

Republicans
 Scott Dyer

District 3

Democrats
 Phil Andrews, incumbent (winner)
 Bob Doresy, Rockville City Councilman

Republicans
 Henry Maraffa

District 4

Democrats
 Mike Jones
 Marilyn Praisner, incumbent (winner)

Republicans
 Mark Fennel

District 5

Democrats
 Valerie Ervin, school board member (winner)
 Hans Riemer

Republicans
 Dennis Walsh

Prince George's County

Declared Candidates

Democrats

Republicans

Potential Candidates

Democrats

Republicans

Wicomico County

External links
Prince George's County Primary Election September 12, 2006

See also

County offices
County government in Maryland
Maryland county offices